Bartram Avenue station is a SEPTA Route 102 trolley station in Collingdale, Pennsylvania. The station is officially located at Woodlawn and Bartram Avenues. This is the fourth to last station stop on the Route 102 line, and the third to last stop to run along Woodlawn Avenue.

Trolleys arriving at this station travel between 69th Street Terminal in Upper Darby, Pennsylvania and Chester Pike (US 13) in Sharon Hill, Pennsylvania. Unlike the North Street stop, the Route 102 line travels on its own single track right-of-way on both sides of the road for which the station is named.

Station layout

External links

 Station from Bartram Avenue from Google Maps Street View

SEPTA Media–Sharon Hill Line stations